Faisal Akram (born 20 August 2003) is a Pakistani cricketer. In September 2021, he was named in Southern Punjab's squad for the 2021–22 National T20 Cup. He made his Twenty20 debut on 24 September 2021, for Southern Punjab in the 2021–22 National T20 Cup.

In December 2021, he was named in Pakistan's team for the 2022 ICC Under-19 Cricket World Cup in the West Indies. Later the same month, he was signed by the Karachi Kings following the players' draft for the 2022 Pakistan Super League. He made his List A debut on 6 March 2022, for Southern Punjab in the 2021–22 Pakistan Cup.

References

External links
 

2003 births
Living people
Pakistani cricketers
Place of birth missing (living people)